Charles L. McGaha (February 26, 1914 – August 8, 1984) was a United States Army soldier and a recipient of the United States military's highest decoration—the Medal of Honor—for his actions in World War II.

Biography
McGaha was born in the small town of Cosby in eastern Tennessee to Laura McGaha. His family had a long history of service in the United States military. In October 1937, at age 23, he traveled to Asheville, North Carolina, hoping to enlist in the United States Navy. The navy recruiter, not needing any more enlistees, turned him away, so McGaha left for Knoxville and joined the United States Army instead.

In 1941, McGaha was stationed in Pearl Harbor, Hawaii, with Company G of the 35th Infantry Regiment, 25th Infantry Division. He was there when the Japanese attacked on December 7, 1941, precipitating the United States' entrance into World War II.

McGaha fought in the Guadalcanal Campaign and the northern Solomons before participating in the campaign to recapture the Philippines from Japanese control. On February 7, 1945, he was serving as a master sergeant during the Battle of Luzon. On that day, near Lupao, Luzon, he repeatedly exposed himself to enemy fire in order to aid wounded soldiers, led his platoon after the platoon leader was wounded, and deliberately drew Japanese fire onto himself so that others could escape to safety. For these actions, he was nominated for the Medal of Honor and given a battlefield commission to second lieutenant. McGaha was then discharged from the Army, but soon re-enlisted as a master sergeant and was stationed at Fort Benning, Georgia. His nomination for the Medal of Honor was approved a year after the battle, on April 2, 1946. During a ceremony at the White House on March 27, 1946, President Harry S. Truman formally presented McGaha and another man, Navy Commander Richard O'Kane, with Medals of Honor.

In December 1949, McGaha married Jeanette Large.

McGaha again became a commissioned officer and reached the rank of major before retiring from the Army. 

McGaha died at age 70, after being stabbed forty times in an apparent robbery attempt, and was buried in Union Cemetery, Newport, Tennessee.

Awards
A full list of his decorations includes the 
Medal of Honor
Purple Heart with three oak leaf clusters
Good Conduct Medal
American Defense Service Medal with "Foreign Service" clasp
Asiatic-Pacific Campaign Medal with four campaign stars
World War II Victory Medal
Philippine Liberation Ribbon with star

McGaha also received the Combat Infantryman Badge and Master Parachutist Badge with star.

Medal of Honor citation
McGaha's official Medal of Honor citation reads:

See also

List of Medal of Honor recipients
List of Medal of Honor recipients for World War II

References

United States Army personnel of World War II
United States Army Medal of Honor recipients
People from Cosby, Tennessee
United States Army officers
Recipients of the Silver Star
1914 births
1984 deaths
World War II recipients of the Medal of Honor